National Route 14 is a highway connecting the Central Highlands provinces together and connecting the Central Highlands with the North Central Coast and Southeast.

References

14